Chalyan (also Romanized as Chālyān) is a village in Zeri Rural District, Qatur District, Khoy County, West Azerbaijan Province, Iran. At the 2006 census, its population was 652, in 135 families.

References 

Populated places in Khoy County